Paramenesia nigrescens is a species of beetle in the family Cerambycidae. It was described by Stephan von Breuning in 1966. It is known from Vietnam.

References

Saperdini
Beetles described in 1966